The 13th New Brunswick Legislative Assembly represented New Brunswick between December 28, 1843, and September 16, 1846.

The assembly sat at the pleasure of the Governor of New Brunswick William MacBean George Colebrooke.

John Wesley Weldon was chosen as speaker for the house.

History

Members

Notes:

References
Journal of the House of Assembly of ... New Brunswick from ... January to ... April, 1843 ... (1843)

Terms of the New Brunswick Legislature
1843 in Canada
1844 in Canada
1845 in Canada
1846 in Canada
1843 establishments in New Brunswick
1846 disestablishments in New Brunswick